Benjamin M. McCollum (born April 12, 1981) is the men's basketball head coach at Northwest Missouri State University in Maryville, Missouri.

McCollum was born in Iowa City, Iowa, and grew up in Storm Lake, Iowa, where he graduated from St. Mary's High School in 1999. He played basketball for two years at North Iowa Area Community College before transferring in 2001 to Northwest, where he played for Steve Tappmeyer as the school made its first Elite Eight appearance. He graduated from Northwest in 2003 with a degree in business finance and received a master's degree in athletic administration from the school in 2004. He was an assistant coach at Emporia State University from 2004 to 2008, then joined Northwest as its head coach in 2009.

McCollum's team struggled the first two seasons with records of 12–15 in 2009–10 and 10–16 in 2010–11. In the 2011–12 season, his team went 22–7, won the regular-season MIAA crown and played in the first round of the NCAA tournament. In 2012, he was honored for the turnaround with the Clarence Gaines Award as the best NCAA Division II coach.

Head coach record

References

External links

 McCollum's Biography

1982 births
Living people
American men's basketball coaches
American men's basketball players
Basketball coaches from Iowa
Basketball players from Iowa
College men's basketball head coaches in the United States
Emporia State Hornets basketball coaches
Junior college men's basketball players in the United States
Northwest Missouri State Bearcats men's basketball coaches
Northwest Missouri State Bearcats men's basketball players
People from Storm Lake, Iowa